Krakda (Arabic: كراكدة) is a municipality in El Bayadh Province, Algeria. It part of Brézina district and has a population of 2.103, which gives it 7 seats in the PMA. Its postal code is 32160 and its municipal code is 3215.

Communes of El Bayadh Province
El Bayadh Province